Sir Percival Joseph Griffiths KBE CIE (15 January 1899 – 14 July 1992) was a prominent businessman who also worked for the Indian Civil Service.

Career 
Griffiths passed M.A from Cambridge. A large part of his service career was spent in eastern India. Griffiths took the charge of District Magistrate of undivided Medinipur, West Bengal in 1933. He retired from the service in 1937 while deputy commissioner in Darjeeling. Apart from his working knowledge in European languages, he was fluent in Bengali and also knew Hindi, Urdu, Tibetan, Nepalese, and Sanskrit. After retirement he stayed in India and acted as representative for European businesses. He was knighted in 1947 and became adviser to the Indian and Pakistan Tea Association.

Books 
He was a prolific writer and pamphleteer. Some of his prominent publications include:

 The British Impact on India (1952)
 Modern India (1957)
 The History of the Indian Tea Industry (1967)
 To Guard my People (1971)
 A Licence to Trade: the History of the English Chartered Companies (1974)
 A History of the Inchcape Group (1977)
 Vignettes of India (1985)

References

External links 
 Oxford Dictionary of National Biography
 The archive papers of Percival Griffiths are held by SOAS Special Collections

1899 births
1992 deaths
British people in colonial India
British Empire
Indian Civil Service (British India) officers
British writers
People from Cambridge